The Afternoon Play is a British television anthology series, which consists of standalone contemporary dramas first shown during the daytime on BBC One. The first episode, entitled "Turkish Delight", aired on 27 January 2003. Since, a total of twenty-five episodes have been broadcast across five series. The last episode was broadcast on 26 January 2007. The series was nominated for a BAFTA award in 2005 for Best New Director for an episode directed by the actress Sarah Lancashire. As of 2009, the series has been replaced in the schedules by fellow anthology series Moving On, which follows a very similar format.

Transmissions

Episodes

Series 1 (2003)

Series 2 (2004)

Series 3 (2005)

Series 4 (2006)

Series 5 (2007)

See also
 Armchair Theatre
 Theatre 625
 The Wednesday Play
 ITV Playhouse
 Play for Today
 Screen One

References

External links
 
 

2000s British drama television series
2003 British television series debuts
2000s British anthology television series
British drama television series
English-language television shows
2007 British television series endings
BBC Daytime television series